Thomas McCarthy (1832 – September 23, 1870) was a businessman and political figure in Canada East, later Quebec, Canada. He was a Conservative member of the House of Commons of Canada representing Richelieu from 1867 to 1870.

He was born in County Cork, Ireland in 1832, the son of John McCarthy, and came to Canada in 1839. McCarthy was a shipbuilder in the Sorel region in partnership with his brothers Daniel and John. He served on the council for Sorel in 1860, 1862, 1863 and 1865. McCarthy died at Sorel in 1870 while still in office.

Electoral record

References 

Conservative Party of Canada (1867–1942) MPs
Irish emigrants to pre-Confederation Quebec
Members of the House of Commons of Canada from Quebec
Politicians from County Cork
1832 births
1870 deaths
People from Cork (city)
Immigrants to Lower Canada
Anglophone Quebec people